The Clandestine Insurgent Rebel Clown Army (also known as CIRCA and Clown Army) is an anti-authoritarian left-wing activist group that uses clowning and non-violent tactics to act against corporate globalisation, war, and on other issues. The group originated circa 2003 in the United Kingdom.

History
CIRCA emerged from the direct action movement and has participated in protests against George W. Bush's visit to the UK in 2003 and demonstrations against the 2003 invasion of Iraq.

The group was particularly prominent in many of the actions organised around the 31st G8 summit held in Gleneagles during July 2005.  Members of CIRCA entertained children in Auchterarder while waiting for permission to march near the summit.

CIRCA has active groups in the United Kingdom, Ireland, the Netherlands, Belgium, France, Denmark, Germany, and Israel, and many other groups have appeared that have been inspired by the work of the original group.

Appearance
Those participating in CIRCA actions typically dress in military-style camouflage clothing supplemented with brightly coloured trimmings and political logos. The costumes both create a comical atmosphere and serve to maintain anonymity during protests. 'Armaments' are usually limited to feather dusters, although some carry water pistols. The complete ensemble of the costume and traditional clown make-up (usually consisting of a white face and red nose) creates a sense of ridiculousness which seeks to challenge preconceptions of radical activists.

Beliefs
CIRCA claims that there is more to the group than simply dressing up and being playful. There is also a psychology which informs its actions: the clown persona can be used to defuse tense situations and engage with police in public order situations. In order to learn this 'recruits' must participate in a training workshop aka Big Shoe Camp before deployment.

In an article about the G8 protests, the Edinburgh Evening News described CIRCA as "an anarchist splinter group," but a member denied this, saying that while some members would describe themselves as anarchists "...most would consider themselves 'horizontalists' where we engage people without the need for leaders."

Police infiltration 
In 2020, the Yorkshire Evening Post reported that CIRCA had been infiltrated by undercover police in the early 2000s, with one officer having trained as a clown in order to infiltrate the group.

See also

 Loldiers of Odin
 Overpass Light Brigade
 Tactical frivolity

References 

Advocacy groups in the United Kingdom
Clowning
Political movements
Culture jamming